A list of films produced in Egypt in 1939. For an A-Z list of films currently on Wikipedia, see :Category:Egyptian films.

References list

External links
 Egyptian films of 1939 at the Internet Movie Database
 Egyptian films of 1939 elCinema.com

Lists of Egyptian films by year
1939 in Egypt
Lists of 1939 films by country or language